Ek Aur Ek Gyarah is a 2003 Indian action comedy film by  David Dhawan. This movie stars the comedic veterans Govinda and Sanjay Dutt.

Synopsis
Tara (Govinda) and Sitara (Sanjay Dutt) are brothers who are notorious, lovable, small-town con-men who are always in trouble with the law. One day when the police are chasing them, they mistakenly shoot one of the most deadly criminals who goes by the name Cobra (Ashish Vidyarthi). They look for cover and find themselves at Major Ram Singh's house (Jackie Shroff) who got Cobra's brother Panther (Gulshan Grover) arrested because he and Cobra tried to steal a very advanced gun. Tara and Sitara go to Singh's house but, since he is an army officer, he at first doesn't allow them, but later does.

Living in his house for a while, Tara and Singh's sister (Nandini Singh) fall in love; Sitara and Singh's sister's friend (Amrita Arora) fall in love, too. One day, while in the house, they watch TV and learn that Cobra has come back. They realize that Cobra has kidnapped their mother (Himani Shivpuri) so he can force Tara and Sitara to get Panther out of Ram Singh's jail. They succeed in getting Panther out of jail. Cobra returns their mother.

Ram Singh realizes that he has been fooled by the two; they watch him on TV being embarrassed by the media. Sitara and Tara realize they should get revenge on Cobra and Panther. They go to Singh's house and tell him how they were forced by Cobra to deceive him. Singh forgives them. The brothers leave to catch the two criminals. They succeed and all ends well.

Cast
Govinda - Tara
Sanjay Dutt - Sitara
Jackie Shroff - Major Ram Singh
Amrita Arora - Preeti
Nandini Singh - Pinky Singh
Gulshan Grover - Panther
Ashish Vidhyarthi - Cobra
Rajpal Yadav - Chotu
Javed Khan - Raju Nepali
Mushtaq Khan - Inspector Bahadur Singh
Himani Shivpuri - Tara and Sitara's mother
 Supriya Karnik - Preeti's mother
Tiku Talsania - Tiku
Mahesh Anand - Capt. Mahesh
Ajay Nagrath - Ram Singh's son
Ajit Vachani - Dr. Subramaniam

Soundtracks
Music by Shankar-Ehsaan-Loy. Lyrics were by Sameer.

References

External links
 

2003 films
2000s Hindi-language films
Films directed by David Dhawan
Films scored by Shankar–Ehsaan–Loy
2003 action comedy films
 Indian buddy films
Indian crime comedy films
Indian action comedy films
2000s masala films